Turkey is a presidential republic with a multi-party system. Major parties are defined as political parties that received more than 7% of the votes in the latest general election and/or represented in parliament. Minor parties are defined as political parties that have fulfilled the requirements of the Supreme Election Council (Yüksek Seçim Kurulu in Turkish, abbreviated as YSK) and whose names have been listed on ballots. Forming a political party without prior permission is a constitutional right, but the Interior Ministry may delay registering a new party for years, so the party cannot stand in elections.

If the ID and serial number of a person's Turkish identity card is known anyone can query their political party membership via the website of the General Prosecution Office of the Supreme Court of Appeal or mobile phone messages.

Political parties represented in the Turkish Parliament 

General information about the parties holding seats in the Grand National Assembly as of 2021:

The number of deputies required to form a political party group in the Turkish Parliament is 20.

Political parties with the same number of deputy members are listed alphabetically.

Other political parties 
Other parties eligible to contest in elections (by january 2022)

General information on other political parties registered in the Ministry of Interior:

Former

Inactive parties
The following parties are inactive, and they are not listed in the active political parties list by the Supreme Court of Appeal.

Defunct and historical parties

These are some of the parties that were dismantled because of their internal dynamics, mergers, inability to find electoral base or through governmental intervention, for instance following the Turkish coups d'état.

Banned parties
These are some of the parties that were banned through extraordinary courts or the Constitutional Court of Turkey.

See also
 Politics of Turkey
 List of political parties by country
 Communist Party of Turkey (disambiguation)
 List of illegal political parties in Turkey
 List of historical parties in Turkey
 Turkish general elections before 1980
 Turkish general elections after 1980
 List of party leaders in Turkey

Notes

References

External links
 Active political parties according to the chief prosecutor :tr:Yargıtay Cumhuriyet Başsavcılığı (Türkiye)

 
Political parties
Turkey
 
Turkey